The Old Chicago Main Post Office is a nine-story-tall building in downtown Chicago.  The original building was designed by Graham, Anderson, Probst & White and built in 1921, but the structure was expanded greatly in 1932 in order to serve Chicago's great volume of postal business, swollen by the mail-order businesses of Montgomery Ward (the largest retailer in the United States) and of Sears (its competitor).

The Old Post Office is home to many corporate offices including Walgreens, Ferrara Candy Company, PepsiCo, Cisco Systems, Uber, CBOE, Home Chef, and more.

History 

The original 1922 structure was a brick-sided mail terminal building, sited just east of the main building that spans the Eisenhower Expressway as it turns into Ida B. Wells Drive. Its footprint, as initially designed, would have blocked the proposed Congress Parkway extension; as a compromise, a hole for the Parkway was reserved in the base of the Post Office and utilized twenty years later. Competitors Montgomery Ward and Sears combined to make Chicago "the nation's mail-order capital". (Montgomery Ward, which became the largest retailer in the United States in the late 1930s, was eventually passed by Sears, and then was purchased and merged.) In 1966 the Main Chicago Post Office came to a halt when a logjam of 10 million pieces of mail clogged the system for nearly a week. With Chicago rated worst in postal deliveries, a new Main Post Office to be located right across Harrison Street was proposed. In 1997, the old building was vacated in favor of the new, modernized facility. The building was listed on the National Register of Historic Places in 2001. 

A February 2006 report by the General Accounting Office stated that it cost the government $2 million a year to maintain the retired building. On June 9, 2009, the Chicago Sun-Times reported that the postal service was placing the post office on the auction block.  Held on August 27 and conducted by Rick Levin & Associates Inc., the auction raised $40 million, which was well over the opening bid of $300,000. The buyer was reported to be English real estate developer Bill Davies. While Davies missed an October 10, 2009 deadline to close the deal, he finally acquired the building on October 21, 2009, paying about $17 million.

Redevelopment plan, 2011–2014 

The Old Chicago Main Post Office Redevelopment was an approved  project on a lot located along the Chicago River on the southwest side of Downtown Chicago, Illinois to be constructed in phases over a period of one decade that would have included the renovation of the building as well as residential, retail, entertainment and office space. It would also have included two 60-story residential towers as well as a 40-story hotel. All the buildings in the development were to be connected via a ground-level complex that would have been built over the Chicago River and the Eisenhower Expressway. More specifically, it was exactly one year and nine months after acquiring the post office property from the Postal Service when Davies unveiled his plan for the Post Office on July 21, 2011. The proposal, which involved three other properties besides the 14-story Post Office, was broken down into three phases pending the required $3.5 billion in funding:

 Phase 1: Converting the Post Office into a retail complex whose main entrance would be through the Beaux Arts-inspired lobby along Van Buren street, the remaining interior would become a parking garage, and a 40-story hotel on the east side of the building.  (Approximate cost: $450 million)
 Phase 2: Building a 60-story hotel west of the Post Office and a 120-story,  office, hotel, and residential tower that would be the tallest in North America.  (Approximate cost: $2 billion)
 Phase 3: Two residential towers built on the east side of the Chicago River diagonally southeast from the proposed 120-story skyscraper plus a 12,000 space parking garage.  (Approximate cost: $1 billion)

The whole $3.5 billion plan was submitted to the Chicago City Council and the Planning Commission for approval the same day it was released to the public.  Only funding for Phase 1 had been secured as of July 21, 2011. The proposal was sent to the Chicago City Commission in July 2011 for approval, which was expected to be a several-month process. The project had an estimated cost of $3.5 billion and the potential to create 12,000 jobs. Some critics opposed the proposal, calling it old-fashioned and suburban and an unrealistic pipe dream, as it was largely car oriented (12,000 parking spaces and free parking) with shopping mall style retail. The city voted and approved the plan July 18, 2013.

In spring of 2013, Antunovich Associates, who purchased the site three years ago, created a new proposal on the site featuring a 1000-foot skyscraper (with a 2,000 foot tower in their 2nd phase).  Other potential uses include a casino and/or entertainment complex. On June 18, 2014, Bill Davies announced the formation of a $500 million joint venture with Sterling Bay Companies for phase I of the redevelopment. On July 18, Sterling announced a new relationship with J.P. Morgan Asset Management, which gave them access to new financial resources. However, Davies never found sufficient financing. In December 2014, Davies canceled the project and put the post office building up for sale.

After sitting vacant for nearly two decades, the building was bought in 2014 by English real estate developer Bill Davies for $24 million at auction. Davies proposed an ambitious redevelopment plan that was never realized; on May 13, 2016, the building was sold by Davies, who died the next day.

2016 sale and reconstruction 

In February 2016, Chicago mayor Rahm Emanuel pressed for development of the site, threatening to take possession of the building by use of eminent domain.  In March, the city's Department of Planning and Development issued an RFP seeking bids due June 10 for redevelopment of the site.  Later that week, with announcement of a conditional sale of the building, it turned out that Davies had been in negotiation since May 2015 for sale of the building to 601W, a New York City-based real estate company which owns Chicago's Aon Center and One Prudential Plaza buildings. 

On May 13, 2016, completion of the sale from Davies to 601W was announced by Emanuel. Davies died the next day. Vicky Flores, who ran the Chicago office of Davies' firm, commented: "It was really weird, the timing. Everything was signed off, and then I heard he had died. It was like he waited until everything was taken care of." In a $500 million renovation, Gensler plans on renovation of the space into office space, with addition of a rooftop park and a riverwalk. In September 2017 the post office was one of 6 sites in Chicago considered for the new Amazon "HQ2" location. In September 2019, Uber Freight announced it would be based at the site, adding 2,000 jobs.

After extensive renovations undergone by real-estate company 601W, the building opened to office tenants in October 2019. In August 2019, Uber signed a 10-year lease to become the building's largest tenant, occupying . Construction on the space to be utilized by Uber will begin in the spring of 2020. The structure will also include new Chicago offices for Walgreens, occupying  and housing 1,800 employees. PepsiCo will relocate its Chicago office of 1,300 employees and occupy , while the Ferrara Candy Company announced that it would relocate its headquarters to the Post Office building in 2019, occupying  and bringing nearly 400 jobs. The Federal Home Loan Bank of Chicago will also be a tenant.

In popular culture 
The building was used in the filming of Batman Begins in 2004, and  The Dark Knight in April 2007. 
The building is seen from above in the opening credits of Candyman. In the summer of 2010, Paramount Pictures and Michael Bay filmed numerous scenes for Transformers: Dark of the Moon in and around Chicago. The old Chicago Post Office's east facade was decorated as the "Department of Health and Human Services" where the Autobots were kept by the federal government in the movies. The same interior that was used for filming of the bank heist in The Dark Knight was used again for Transformers: Dark of the Moon. There were also some scattered shots from  the Post Office interior used throughout the film.

See also 
List of United States post offices

References

External links 

U.S. Post Office, Chicago at Emporis
"Biggest Post Office To Be Built In Chicago", August 1931, Popular Science

Government buildings completed in 1921
Government buildings on the National Register of Historic Places in Chicago
Post office buildings on the National Register of Historic Places in Illinois
Proposed skyscrapers in the United States
Skyscraper office buildings in Chicago
1921 establishments in Illinois